Park Sung-joon is a Korean name consisting of the family name Park and the given name Sung-joon, and may also refer to:

 Park Sung-joon (golfer) (born 1986), South Korean golfer
 Park Sung-joon (electronic sports) (born 1986), South Korean electronic sports player